The Papists Act 1778 is an Act of the Parliament of Great Britain (18 George III c. 60) and was the first Act for Roman Catholic relief. Later in 1778 it was also enacted by the Parliament of Ireland. 

Before the Act, a number of "Penal laws" had been enacted in Britain and Ireland, which varied between the jurisdictions from time to time but effectively excluded those known to be Roman Catholics from public life. The timing of the Act was partly based on the fact that the Papacy had stopped recognising the Jacobite cause on the death of the "Young Pretender" in 1766, and also the possibility that the ongoing American rebellion of 1775 might inspire a rebellion by Catholics in the Kingdom of Ireland.

Effect of the Act
By this Act, an oath was imposed, which besides a declaration of loyalty to the reigning sovereign, contained an abjuration of the Pretender, and of certain doctrines attributed to Roman Catholics, such as that excommunicated princes may lawfully be murdered, that no faith should be kept with heretics, and that the Pope had temporal as well as spiritual jurisdiction in Great Britain.

Those taking this oath were exempted from some of the provisions of the Popery Act 1698. Although it did not grant freedom of worship, it allowed Catholics to join the army and purchase land if they took an oath of allegiance. The section as to taking and prosecuting priests was repealed, as well as the penalty of perpetual imprisonment for keeping a school. Roman Catholics were also enabled to inherit and purchase land, nor was an heir who conformed to the Established church any longer empowered to enter and enjoy the estate of his "papist" kinsman.

The passing of this act was the occasion of the Gordon Riots (1780) in which the violence of the mob was especially directed against Lord Mansfield, who had objected to various prosecutions under the statutes now repealed.

This Act remained on the statute book until it was repealed by the Promissory Oaths Act 1871 (c.48).

See also
Catholic Emancipation
Roman Catholic Relief Act 1791
Roman Catholic Relief Act 1829

Notes and references

Bibliography

Christianity and law in the 18th century
Repealed Great Britain Acts of Parliament
Great Britain Acts of Parliament 1778
History of Christianity in the United Kingdom
1778 in Christianity
Law about religion in the United Kingdom